Andramasina is a district of Analamanga in Madagascar.

Communes
The district is further divided into 14 communes:

 Abohimiadana
 Alarobia Vatosola
 Alatsinainy Bakaro
 Andohariana
 Andramasina
 Anjoma Faliarivo
 Anosibe Trimoloharano
 Antotohazo, Andramasina
 Fitsinjovana Bakaro
 Mandrosoa
 Morarano Soafiraisana
 Sabotsy Ambohitromby
 Sabotsy Manjakavahoaka
 Tankafatra

References 

Districts of Analamanga